Jason Peter Wood (born 24 May 1968) is an Australian politician and former police officer. He is a member of the Liberal Party and served as the Assistant Minister for Customs, Community Safety and Multicultural Affairs in the Morrison Government from May 2019 until May 2022, following the appointment of the Albanese ministry. He represents the Division of La Trobe in Victoria, which he has held since 2013 and previously from 2004 to 2010.

Early life
Wood was born on 24 May 1968 in Sutherland, New South Wales. He grew up in Ferny Creek, Victoria, attending Ferny Creek Primary School and Ferntree Gully Technical School. His final year of secondary education was completed at Boronia Secondary College. He specialised in outdoor education and briefly worked as a school camp coordinator.

Wood joined the Victoria Police in 1988 and from 1990 was a detective in the organised crime squad. He completed a graduate diploma in innovative service management and a Master of Applied Science at RMIT University. He was involved in investigating gangland figure Alphonse Gangitano. In 2003 Wood became a senior sergeant in the counter-terrorism coordination unit. The Age reported in 2004 that he was "believed to be youngest senior sergeant in the force and has received various commendations".

Political career
Wood joined the Liberal Party in 2000. He stood unsuccessfully in the Division of Holt for the Liberal Party at the 2001 federal election. From 2002 to 2003 he was the vice-president of the party's Boronia/Dandenong Ranges branch.

Wood was elected to the House of Representatives at the 2004 federal election, retaining the Division of La Trobe for the Liberals following the retirement of Bob Charles. From December 2004 he served on the House of Representatives Standing Committee on Environment and Heritage as well as the Joint Statutory Committee for the Australian Crime Commission.

In a speech he made in parliament in 2009, Wood said he had often campaigned on environmental issues, had formerly supported an emissions trading scheme, and had been a member of Greenpeace for longer than he had been a member of the Liberal Party. He was defeated by Australian Labor Party candidate Laura Smyth at the 2010 election, but regained La Trobe at the 2013 election.

In 2013, he was appointed chair of the Joint Standing Committee on Migration. During the 2016–2019 parliamentary term, Wood campaigned on law and order issues, particularly in relation to African youth gangs.

After winning re-election in 2019, Wood was appointed as Assistant Minister for Customs, Community Safety and Multicultural Affairs in the Morrison Government and held this position until May 2022, following the appointment of the Albanese ministry.

Wood is a member of the centre-right faction of the Liberal Party. He lives with his family in Mount Dandenong, approximately 11kms outside his electorate, in the Division of Casey

References

External links
 

1968 births
Living people
Members of the Australian House of Representatives
Members of the Australian House of Representatives for La Trobe
Liberal Party of Australia members of the Parliament of Australia
Australian police officers
RMIT University alumni
21st-century Australian politicians
People from Yarra Ranges
Politicians from Melbourne